Metaphrynella sundana (Borneo treefrog or Bornean tree hole frog) is a species of frog in the family Microhylidae. It is endemic to Borneo and found in Brunei, Indonesia, and Malaysia.

Description
The body is stocky and the limbs are moderately short. Skin has rounded tubercles that are larger on the sides. Colouration and texture show considerable variation.

The male has a median subgular vocal sac. Males call at night from tree holes that are about  meters above the ground. Males are able to adjust their call to the resonance frequency of the tree hole they call from.

Habitat and conservation
The species' natural habitats are lowland primary rainforests to about  asl. It is a common frog in primary and secondary rainforests. Reproduction takes place in tree holes with water. It is threatened by habitat loss from clear-cutting.

References

External links
 Sound recordings of Metaphrynella sundana at BioAcoustica

Metaphrynella
Endemic fauna of Borneo
Amphibians of Brunei
Amphibians of Indonesia
Amphibians of Malaysia
Amphibians described in 1867
Taxa named by Wilhelm Peters
Taxonomy articles created by Polbot
Amphibians of Borneo